(stylized KOSÉ) is a Japanese multinational personal care company, marketing cosmetics, skin care and hair care products.

History
The company was founded in 1946 by Kozaburo Kobayashi with his son as the principal chemist. In 1956, the company established Albion, a manufacturer of premium cosmetics. Kosé and L’Oréal of France signed an agreement for technological cooperation, a joint venture that lasted until 2001. The company expanded it's international presence in Asia during the 1960s to the 1980s. The company's name was changed to its present one in 1991, while in 2000 it was listed on the First Section of the Tokyo Stock Exchange.

Kazutoshi Kobayashi, the founder's grandson, took over as the company's CEO in 2007. Under the leadership of the new CEO, Kosé introduced the Jill Stuart branded cosmetics after the company acquired global trademark rights for the brand in 2009. Kosé subsequently expanded into the European and North American markets when it acquired Tarte Cosmetics in 2014.

Advertising
Kosé's products were advertised over the years by models including Kate Moss for it's Decorté brand photographed by Mario Testino, and Yui Aragaki, for the Esprique line of makeup.

References

External links 

  

Cosmetics companies of Japan
Chemical companies based in Tokyo
Companies listed on the Tokyo Stock Exchange
Chemical companies established in 1946
Japanese companies established in 1946
Multinational companies headquartered in Japan
Japanese brands